Cédric Marshall Kissy (born 1988 in Grand-Bassam) is an Ivorian poet who has won several prizes.

Publications 
2010: Ciel d’Amour, terre de haine, Éditions Edilivre.
2011: Tréfonds de cœurs de pierre, Éditions l’Harmattan
2012: Tendresse et passion, anthologie des plus beaux poèmes d'amour de la Saint-Valentin
2012: L'amour selon elle, Nouvelles, Éditions Balafons
2013: La circulation des idées,  Le texte vivant

References

1988 births
Living people
Ivorian novelists
Ivorian male writers
Male novelists
Ivorian poets
Male poets
People from Grand-Bassam
21st-century poets
21st-century novelists
21st-century male writers